Harold Phil Gant (born January 10, 1940), known for his many nicknames such as "The Bandit", "High Groove Harry", "Hard Luck Harry", "Mr. September", and perhaps mostly as "Handsome Harry", is a retired American stock car racing driver best known for driving the No. 33 Skoal Bandit car on the NASCAR Winston Cup Series circuit during the 1980s and 1990s and his 4-race win streak in 1991.

Nicknames
Gant gained a lot of nicknames throughout his racing career. Early on, "Sug" Thompson, announcer at New Asheville Speedway,  nicknamed Harry "The Taylorsville Flash".  He was later known as "Handsome Harry Gant" due to his Hollywood-style good looks, the "Bandit" after his longtime sponsor Skoal Bandit, "Mr. September" after winning four consecutive Winston Cup races and two Busch Series races in September 1991, "High Groove Harry" after the high line he often took through the corner, and "Hard Luck Harry" for numerous second place finishes in the beginning of his career and later numerous mechanical failures and crashes not of his own doing while leading or running well with Mach I racing.

Career prior to Winston Cup

The North Carolina native began his racing career at the old dirt track in Hickory. He built a hobby class car with his friends, and took turns behind the wheel. Gant became the full-time driver and won the track championship. Hickory Speedway was paved in 1967 after Ned Jarrett became the promoter. Gant excelled on the asphalt, and won his first race in the sportsman division.

He won over 300 races with the car builder and crew chief Kenneth H. Sigmon, in the NASCAR Sportsman on his way to winning three national championships, in 1972, 1973, and 1974. He finished second three times in the NASCAR Late Model Sportsman Division in 1969, 1976, and 1977. He finished in the top 10 of the final points standing in several other years.

He sold half of his construction business in 1979 upon deciding to race full-time in the Winston Cup Series.

Winston Cup career

Gant made his first Cup start in 1973 at Charlotte Motor Speedway, finishing eleventh in the No. 90 Ford for Donlavey Racing despite initially not being interested in the opportunity. He made six starts over the next four years and had two top-ten finishes. His first full season in Winston Cup was in 1979. He competed for the rookie of the year honors against Dale Earnhardt and Terry Labonte. He finished fourth in the overall rookie battle in the No. 47 Race Hill Farm car for Jack Beebe. He split the next season between the No. 47 and the No. 75 RahMoc Enterprises entry, finishing 21st in points.

After starting out the 1981 season driving for various teams, he moved to the No. 33 Skoal Bandit Pontiac, which was owned by Hal Needham and Burt Reynolds, and Leo Jackson after 1988. Gant debuted with the team by placing second at Darlington Raceway, followed by five more second-place finishes and three poles, ending the season third in points standings. He stayed with the team for the rest of his career.

Gant finished second 10 times before winning his first Winston Cup race, at Martinsville April 25, 1982, in the Virginia National Bank 500 and he finished fourth in the final points standings. In 1983, Gant only won once at Darlington in the Transouth 400 and collect 10 top 5s and 16 top ten finishes en route to seventh in the final points standings. In 1984, Harry Gant notched 3 poles, 15 top five finishes, and 23 top ten finishes and won at Pocono and Martinsville in the fall, he ended up finishing second to eventual Winston Cup champion Terry Labonte. In 1985, Gant won at Martinsville in the spring, and at Dover and at North Wilkesboro in the fall, notching a career best for Gant up to that point. He finished third in championship standings, 259 points behind eventual champion Darrell Waltrip. Gant went winless for three years from 1986-1988 and in 1989, he broke a three-year winless streak winning at Darlington in the spring which caused the veteran driver to exclaim "The Bandit is back" in victory lane. He did not win again in 1989 but finished seventh in the final points standings.

Gant won the International Race of Champions (IROC) championship in 1985. He tied on points with Darrell Waltrip but was awarded the title on tiebreak by finishing higher in the final race: a photo-finish win over Labonte at Michigan International Speedway

Gant drove the No. 33 in the 1985 Talladega NASCAR race with the first telemetry data system ever installed on a race car. The data from the car was sent to the CBS television network and broadcast during the TV coverage of the race.

1990s and Mr. September streak
Harry Gant entered the decade with a win at Pocono in the spring of 1990. He finished 17th in the final points standings, with 6 top 5s and 9 top 10s. In 1991, Gant had a career year. He won the 1991 Winston 500 in the spring, gambling on fuel mileage. Fellow competitor Rick Mast drafted behind Gant to give him a push the last few laps but let off in the final laps to preserve the victory. Gant earned the nickname "Mr. September" in 1991 after winning all four September Cup races (Darlington, Richmond, Dover and Martinsville) and two Busch races (Richmond and Dover) at age 51. His crew chief was Andy Petree. The four consecutive cup victories tied the modern era record set in 1972. Dominating at the next race at North Wilkesboro Speedway, Gant had his brakes fail, ending his hopes of five consecutive victories. Gant scored 5 victories in 1991, also notching 15 top-five finishes and 17 top tens, and finishing fourth in the final point standings. Gant followed up 1991 with a strong 1992 and finished 4th in points again. One of five drivers in contention for the championship, six finishes of 13th or worse in the final races doomed his championship hopes. Gant won at Dover in the spring, and he scored his last Cup victory on August 16, 1992, at the Champion Spark Plug 400 at Michigan International Speedway, gambling on fuel. This was also the final victory for Oldsmobile in Cup competition. Harry Gant and the Leo Jackson team switched to Chevrolets in 1993, and at the end of the season, Gant announced that 1994 would be his last season. Gant finished his career with a pole and seven top-ten finishes, finishing 25th in the final point standings.

In 1996, Gant substituted for the injured Bill Elliott in the 1996 Winston Select, driving Elliott's No. 94 McDonald's Ford Thunderbird after Elliott's injuries at Talladega. Gant also ran a partial season in the Craftsman Truck Series in 1996, driving his own No. 33 Westview Capital Chevrolet C/K. He was inducted into the International Motorsports Hall of Fame on April 27, 2006. 

Currently, Gant continues to work on his 300-acre ranch in North Carolina and enjoys riding his motorcycle. In 2015, he was in attendance at Darlington for the Southern 500 to take part in the retro weekend. He also still works on roofs and carpentry in his spare time. Gant once admitted that he "was a good race-car driver but a great carpenter."

Cup records
He holds the record as the oldest driver ever to win a Cup Series race and as the oldest driver ever to collect his first career Cup victory (42 years and 105 days). He is the second oldest driver to win in NASCAR's second-level circuit, now known as the Xfinity Series, after Dick Trickle. In his career he has collected 18 Cup wins and one runner-up finish in 1984 and third in 1981 and 1985, 21 Busch Series wins, and three runner-up finishes in the Busch Series championship (69, 76, and 77). In 1985 won the IROC title. He won four races in a row in 1991 tying a "new era" (1972–present) record and came in second in the fifth race. His five Winston Cup and five Busch Grand National wins in 1991 made him the only driver, at that time, to post the most wins in both series in the same year, although he tied with Davey Allison with five Cup wins (Allison also scored a victory in the non-points All-Star Race).

Movie appearances
He appeared in the 1983 Burt Reynolds movie Stroker Ace. He also gave a short interview in the film Days of Thunder and was mentioned for spinning out in the Daytona 500 late in the movie (although it was actually the No. 26 of Brett Bodine).
He also appeared as a mob henchman in the 1984 movie Cannonball Run II.  His line in the film was "Better not let the boss hear you say that."

Motorsports career results

NASCAR
(key) (Bold – Pole position awarded by qualifying time. Italics – Pole position earned by points standings or practice time. * – Most laps led.)

Winston Cup Series

Daytona 500

Busch Series

Craftsman Truck Series

International Race of Champions
(key) (Bold – Pole position. * – Most laps led.)

References

External links
 
 
 
 Harry Gant at Nascar.com
 Harry Gant at decadesofracing.net

Living people
1940 births
People from Taylorsville, North Carolina
Racing drivers from North Carolina
NASCAR drivers
American Speed Association drivers
International Race of Champions drivers
International Motorsports Hall of Fame inductees